Drissell is a surname. Notable people with the surname include:

 George Drissell (born 1999), English cricketer
 Peter Drissell (born 1955), British Royal Air Force officer

See also
 Driesell
 Driskell

Surnames of Dutch origin